"Please Please Please Let Me Get What I Want" is a song by the English rock band the Smiths. It was released as the B-side of "William, It Was Really Nothing" in 1984 and later featured on the compilation albums Hatful of Hollow and Louder Than Bombs. It has been covered by numerous other artists.

The Dream Academy version

The Dream Academy covered "Please Please Please Let Me Get What I Want" in 1985. This version peaked at #83 in the UK Singles Chart. An instrumental version of this cover was used in the movie Ferris Bueller's Day Off in 1986.

Track listing
7" version
 "Please Please Please Let Me Get What I Want"
 "In Places on the Run"

12" version
 "Please Please Please Let Me Get What I Want"
 "The Party" (acoustic)
 "Please Please Please Let Me Get What I Want" (instrumental)
 "In Places on the Run" (edit)

Chart performance

Slow Moving Millie version

English actress and songwriter Slow Moving Millie released a cover version of the song, adding commas to its title. It was released on 11 November 2011 as a Digital download from her debut studio album Renditions. Her version was selected as the soundtrack to the John Lewis 2011 Christmas advertisement.

Music video
A music video, directed by Nicole Nodland, was released onto YouTube on 11 November 2011 at a length of three minutes and six seconds.

Track listing

Chart performance

Release history

Other notable versions
 American Indie rock band The Halo Benders covered this song as a b-side for their 1995 single Don't Touch My Bikini.
 A cover by Elefant was included on the soundtrack for the 2005 Disney superhero movie Sky High.
 A cover by She & Him (Zooey Deschanel and M. Ward) was included with the original version by the Smiths on the soundtrack for the 2009 movie (500) Days of Summer in which Deschanel starred.
 English rock band Muse covered the song, included in their 2001 EP Hyper Music/Feeling Good. Their version is featured in the film Not Another Teen Movie.
 American Indie band Starflyer 59 covered this song in their 2009 compilation Ghosts of the Past.
 American alternative metal band Deftones covered the song and initially included the cover as a track on the 1995 release of the single 7 Words. The cover was later included on Deftones' 2005 compilation album B-Sides & Rarities and their 2011 cover compilation album, Covers.
 Hootie & The Blowfish also covered the song in their 2000 cover album Scattered, Smothered and Covered.
 American country singer Sarah Darling recorded a cover of the song for her 2017 album Dream Country.
 Irish trance DJ Solarstone borrowed the tune in his 2012 tribute track Please.

In other media 

 The Smiths' original version was included on the soundtrack of the 1986 film Pretty in Pink. It also was included on the soundtrack of the 1999 film "Never Been Kissed".
 Slow Moving Millie’s version was used in the December 11, 2021 episode of Saturday Night Live, hosted by Billie Eilish. On the YouTube and Hulu versions, the song has been replaced with "Christmas Time" by Danny Cope and Elizabeth Reynolds due to copyright issues.

Certifications

The Smiths version

References

1986 singles
1980s ballads
The Smiths songs
The Dream Academy songs
1984 songs
Rock ballads
Songs written by Morrissey
Songs written by Johnny Marr